The indoor hockey competitions at the 2017 Southeast Asian Games in Kuala Lumpur were held at MATRADE Exhibition and Convention Centre in Segambut.

The 2017 Games feature competitions in two events (men's and women's).

Competition schedule

Participation

Participating nations

Men's competition

Group stage

Women's competition

Group stage

Medal summary

Medal table

Medalists

References

External links
  

 
2017
Hockey at the 2017 Southeast Asian Games
2017 Southeast Asian Games events
Southeast Asian Games